Dmitriy Migas (born 25 February 1980) is a Belarusian association football coach and former player (midfielder).

Honours
Belshina Bobruisk
Belarusian Cup winner: 1998–99

References

External links
 

1980 births
Living people
Belarusian footballers
Association football midfielders
FC Belshina Bobruisk players
FC Molodechno players
FC Torpedo Minsk players
FC Dnepr Mogilev players
FC Khimik Svetlogorsk players
FC Osipovichi players
Belarusian football managers
FC Belshina Bobruisk managers
People from Babruysk
Sportspeople from Mogilev Region